Epicatechin gallate (ECG) is a flavan-3-ol, a type of flavonoid, present in green tea. It is also reported in buckwheat and in grape.

The tea component epicatechin gallate is being researched because in vitro experiments showed it can reverse methicillin resistance in bacteria such as Staphylococcus aureus.  Nevertheless, the compound is significantly degraded by steeping in boiling water, unlike related catechins.

Epicatechin, as well as many other flavonoids, has been found to act as a non-selective antagonist of the opioid receptors, albeit with somewhat low affinity.

References

See also 
 List of phytochemicals in food
 Green tea extract

Flavanols
CB1 receptor agonists
Kappa-opioid receptor antagonists
Mu-opioid receptor antagonists